Nicolás Rodríguez Menéndez (21 January 1898 – 26 February 1966) was a Spanish-born Mexican actor. He appeared in more than one hundred films from 1927 to 1967.

Selected filmography

References

External links 

Mexican male film actors
Spanish emigrants to Mexico
1898 births
1966 deaths